James France may refer to:

James France (historian) (born 1930), businessman and historian of art and monasticism
Jim France (born 1944), American motorsports executive